The following are minor characters from Berkeley Breathed's comic strip Bloom County. Though significant enough to have appeared multiple times in the strip, they were not crucial to the strip's overall development, and disappeared without much (if any) explanation long before Breathed segued into his next comic, Outland.

Though the strip's various compilations do not do them justice, the original cast of characters in Bloom County were Milo, Bess, and Major Bloom, along with a basset hound named "Rabies" whose thoughts could be read à la Snoopy; the first year of strips are mysteriously omitted from all compilations save the Bloom Library, although a selection did find publication in a 1986 anthology collection Bloom County Babylon: Five Years of Basic Naughtiness.  Most of the strip's most memorable characters debuted later on, with Milo being the only key character to appear for the duration of the strip's run.

Alphonso Ali
Alphonso Ali was the first significant African American character in Bloom County. An ardent admirer of legendary boxer Muhammad Ali, Alphonso was first introduced as Binkley's opponent in the boxing ring. Later, Alphonso made appearances as a friend of Binkley and Milo, as well as everyone else in the meadow, and fought in "Nicaraguan" war games as well as the Great Snake Massacre. He disappeared in 1983, and was replaced by Oliver Wendell Jones later that year.

Banana Jr. 6000
The Banana Jr. 6000 was Oliver Wendell Jones' sentient personal computer, first introduced to the strip in December 1984 as Oliver's Christmas present. It was a parody of the Macintosh computer, which had been released earlier that year.

The computer inexplicably came with legs and could walk, talk and contemplate its own existence, but could not stray further than the length of its electrical cord. In later strips, the cord disappeared and the Banana Jr. roamed freely. It worshipped the television and would frequently present its "god" with offerings of household appliances. A Sunday strip featured a parody advertisement featuring Kiss bassist Gene Simmons which warned that not having a personal computer could lead children to grow up, wear fishnet stockings, join a heavy metal band, and stick out their tongues down to their kneecaps - like Simmons.

The computer was Oliver's hacking sidekick (only confiscated by the FBI twice) until mid-1985, when Oliver declared it obsolete due mostly to the bankruptcy of the Banana Computer Company (which only sold two units, including Oliver's). It made a later appearance in one of Bill The Cat's liquidation sales.  On July 8, 2021, Oliver pulled the Banana out of a closet to compute the location of Calvin from Calvin & Hobbes and print a picture of Calvin's spacecraft, which was finished printing on July 20, 2021.

Senator Bedfellow
Senator Lucias Bedfellow is an alcoholic, greedy, corrupt United States senator who represents Bloom County's state in the United States Congress.

He frequently came under scrutiny from his constituents in the meadow; at one point Hodge-Podge would honk Bedfellow's nose every time that the man spoke (for talking "bull patties"). The local press also made a habit of going after the Senator - mostly in the form of aggressive and dubious innuendos by Milo Bloom alleging a role by Bedfellow in the disappearance of Jimmy Hoffa. Bedfellow was involved in a number of scandals, albeit ones mostly cooked up by the local press - the final being the illicit trade of illegal Bill the Cat tote bags in 1983. He was convicted and sent to prison, where his final panel in the original strip shows him being approached by burly thugs angered over his support of capital punishment.

Senator Bedfellow eventually reappeared 22 years later as a recurring character in Opus, and then re-reappeared in the resurrected Bloom County webcomic on August 10, 2016.

Tom Binkley
Tom Binkley was Binkley's divorced father, who is seen in a mid-life crisis and frequently suffered the misfortune of being awakened in the early morning hours to hear Binkley repeat dubious celebrity rumors until he became dependent on those episodes to sleep at all. Tom desperately wants Binkley to be tough and athletic. Tom gives Binkley the nickname "Mad Dog" and takes him on ill-fated hunting trips.  He is a solid Democrat and refers to himself as "liberal and modern", though he had a crisis of faith and extreme guilt when he admitted that he didn't like Jesse Jackson. He has disapproved of his son's taste in music, namely when the Rolling Stones and Pink Floyd came to Bloom County; Tom simply tells Michael he will not argue over the music as he "does not converse with pagans". His son's interracial relationship with Blondie was a bone of contention, but Tom ultimately elected not to make a case of it. Tom is also concerned with his approaching middle-age and can be seen fretting about his life and his son Binkley's often well-meaning attempts to help his father accept his aging but in fact making him feel even worse. He drove a '74 Chevrolet Vega and later a Chrysler LeBaron, mentioned in Bloom County Babylon.

In the revived strip, Tom Binkley has returned, and at one point was a secret follower of Donald Trump.  On June 2, 2016, Michael Binkley insulted his father, who spanked him. Later Tom Binkley regretted this and they apologized to each other.

Margaret Binkley, Michael Binkley's mother, was arrested at a protest once, and appears in a few early strips from 1981, such as Sept 12, 1981, when the washing machine was not working right. Later, when working as a shopping mall Santa Claus, Tom Binkley told his son that Tom and Margaret wouldn't reunite because she was now living in Oakland, California with a Hells Angel.

In some early strips (e.g., May 3, 1982), Michael Binkley's father's name appears as "Frank M. Binkley".

Blondie
Not to be confused with the title character of the comic strip Blondie (for whom she was likely named), Blondie was Binkley's African American would-be girlfriend. Originally from Los Angeles, Blondie immediately found herself to be Binkley's crush. She went on a date with Binkley to see Pink Floyd: The Wall, much to Binkley's father's dismay.

She appeared twice more in the strip, but eventually faded away after 1986 without further mention.

Major Bloom
A key character in the early years of the strip, Major Bloom was Milo's jingoistic, right-wing grandfather as well as his custodial guardian. He was initially named "Major P. Flynn" in a very early strip, but was thereafter known as Major Bloom, or more commonly, Major.

The Major frequently had delusions about fighting Nazis and Communists (who usually turned out to be ducks), and tried to lead his grandson "the right way."  In his spare time, he was head coach of Bloom County's pee-wee football team (which he used to live out his lifelong fantasy of being a military commander, a la George S. Patton), whose players included Milo and Michael Binkley.

Like most of the strip's original cast of characters, The Major faded from sight early in the strip's run, circa July 1983, though he was mentioned in the short story "The Great LaRouche Toad-Frog Massacre" in the 1986 book Bloom County Babylon.

While he stopped appearing, he and his wife were presumably still present, as they were responsible for running the boarding house where most of the characters lived.

Bess Bloom
Bess Bloom, otherwise dubbed "Ma" Bloom, was Major Bloom's wife, and grandmother of Milo Bloom. She was most prominent in the first year of the strip, eventually vanishing by mid-1982. Less rigid than her husband, Bess was a faithful wife and was known for being affectionate for all living beings, including cockroaches, which Major Bloom often waged war with.

Mrs. Dallas
Mrs. Dallas occasionally showed up for unexpected visits with her son Steve. In December 1982, Steve's father accompanied her, but wasn't seen later.  She was horrified at his slovenly, womanizing ways, and always tried to convince him to get married and go to church. She appeared as a heavy-set, aproned, fifties-style housewife, except that she also wore Steve's signature black aviator sunglasses. Mrs. Dallas apparently thought Steve's father had died, and had accordingly felt free to remarry five times. Steve eventually revealed that his father had actually been sitting in the living room, reading the paper, the entire time. She did not care for Opus, whom she originally thought to be a large rodent. Opus never realized she was referring to him. She also has appeared several times as a manifestation out of Steve's anxiety closet. Long after the strip ended, Breathed admitted that she was inspired by his own mother.

Kitzi Dallas

In the previous Breathed strip, The Academia Waltz, Kitzi was Steve Dallas' sweetheart and then his wife.  The character appeared in 1982 in a fashion strip . In Bloom County, Kitzi was Steve's baby sister, arrested in May 1984 for protesting apartheid though her sorority did not admit people of color .  In both cases she was a sorority girl with a good heart but no great intelligence.

Ash Dashley
Southerner yacht and baseball millionaire Ashley Dashley III was the arrogant, opportunistic owner and station manager of Bloom County TV; a "visionary", he was prone to butting heads with the Federal Communications Commission (FCC) and self-imposed television censors such as Otis Oracle. After purchasing the station, he made Limekiller his right-hand man with mixed results. He was a recurring character throughout 1981, then disappeared. Ash was intended as a satire of Ted Turner.

Uncle Dewey
Uncle Dewey  appeared in the revived strip as an obese man sitting in a lawn chair, his hair and shirt colored red, white, and blue.  On holidays he would ignorantly 'explain' American ideas as a parody of the 'right wing'.  Milo addressed him as "Uncle Dewey", meaning that he may be the new caretaker of the Bloom boardinghouse, as the Major and Bess, Milo's grandparents, aren't seen in the 21st-century strip.

Armand Dipthong
Armand  was the highly stressed Chief Editor of the Bloom Picayune. A common source of his anxiety was the pressure to sacrifice his journalistic integrity for sleazy tabloidesque stories.  This pressure inevitably came from Milo Bloom, and was usually succumbed to.  He also struggled to write a "truly frank article on the public-health threat of AIDS", at the risk of offending prudish subscribers.

Abby Fillerup
Abby Fillerup entered the strip on Sept 6, 2015, when Cutter John's wheelchair ran over her mother Cozy after rolling down a hill while the characters were roleplaying Star Wars characters and eating ice cream. Michael Binkley had a crush on her but she firmly remained a friend to all the cast, introducing them to yoga, acupuncture, body paint, and other New Age trends. Abby goes to school with Milo Bloom and Michael Binkley and seems to live in the Bloom boarding house. Her politics are somewhat liberal. She has shared a number of storylines with the characters in the revived strip, including mourning the death of Carrie Fisher, questioning Opus' gender identity, and helping the gang cheer up Sam the Lion.

Cozy Fillerup
Cozy Fillerup, a single mother, and her one child, Abby, debuted in Bloom County on Sept 6, 2015.  She soon became a romantic interest of Cutter John, who used crutches instead of his wheelchair sometimes around her.  Cozy was divorced after her husband committed adultery.  She and Cutter became close over the objections of her daughter and began sleeping together.  They baked sticky buns which Cutter John liked.
Cozy Fillerup has dark hair and wears "Hot Patootie Power Pumps".
Cozy has a tattoo of Hobbes from Calvin and Hobbes on one shin.  Cutter John refused to commit to her, however. When he and the group used her serving trays to slide on the ice, she was incensed.

Dr Footlick
Dr Footlick was the dentist whom Steve Dallas saw in strips beginning Sept. 12, 1983; the dentist had quite a sense of humor and used novocaine, which paralyzed Steve's mouth and left his tongue hanging out. As Steve then had a school reunion to attend, he was most embarrassed, and didn't see this dentist again.

Frank the Janitor
This character was introduced in the 21st-century reboot of the strip, on June 25, 2017.  Frank the Janitor cleans floors at the Bloom County Hospital where Sam the Lion is frequently a patient, and is a source of wise and saintly counsel as well. One stormy night, when Steve Dallas and Opus could not sit up with Sam, Opus found that Frank was comforting the boy.  During the total eclipse of 2017 hummingbirds flocked around him in a painting by Breathed. Frank helped Steve Dallas take Lola Granola and the aged Mrs Dumont to see the aurora borealis in a helicopter flown by Bill the Cat, and also provided Opus with a "lair" in the neonatal intensive care unit where the penguin held newborn infants. On August 5, 2018, Frank and Oliver Wendell Jones hacked the Twitter feed of Donald Trump and posted kind and positive messages.
Frank is drawn with his white hair around his head as if it were a halo.

Leona Granola
Leona Granola is the mother of Lola Granola, and was a recurring character during Lola's engagement to Opus. She strongly disapproved of Opus, and repeatedly tried to convince her daughter to dump him. She even went so far as to offer him cash not to marry Lola right as he walked down the aisle. She was not seen in the strip after the storyline of Opus and Lola's wedding.

The Giant Purple Snorklewacker
The Giant Purple Snorklewacker (Snorklewackerus Purplum), specifically a Western Reticulated Snorklewacker, is an odd-looking monster and the leader of the monsters who live in Binkley's closet of anxieties. At night he makes Binkley's nightmares, including such diverse characters as Jesse Helms and Milton Friedman, come alive. Binkley's anxieties were once confused with Ronald Reagan's, causing Yuri Andropov and Fidel Castro to show up in his closet, while the Giant Purple Snorklewacker ended up in the White House. It has appeared frequently in the re-launched version of the strip, in one case even doing Binkley a favor by devouring a group of annoying text messengers.

Frank Jones
Frank Jones is the father (and often unwitting test subject) of Oliver Wendell Jones. He admitted to voting for Alexander Haig in the 1988 Republican primary. He lost faith in life when his satellite dish stopped working, and Oliver was questioned by FBI agents after attempting to unscramble the signal.

He has fallen subject to Oliver's experiments several times.  In one incident, Oliver's "molecular transfer device" put his Jaguar XJ6 into orbit around Pluto. Another time, he accidentally drank some dandelion hallucinogenics that Oliver had prepared for an experiment and thought that Erik Estrada was coming out of his stomach. When he scolded Oliver about the incident, he commented that he wished he had a "ditzy-headed daughter who wouldn't know a test tube if it walked up and bit her." Evidently still feeling the effects of the hallucinogen, he then imagined Oliver having a giant, xeroxed head of Brooke Shields.  He also was part of the "cat sweat scalp tonic scandal" when Oliver created a hair restoration product.  Frank was the lead test subject but, he continued to use the tonic, he displayed symptoms reminiscent to the behavior of Bill the Cat, who had supplied the main "cat sweat" ingredient. In the end, it caused all of his hair to suddenly fall out.

He was referred to as "Howard" in a storyline in which he is erased from existence when Oliver deleted his record from various databases, including those of the IRS. Also, in a storyline where Tom Binkley tries to give up smoking, their first names are switched (i.e. "Frank Binkley" and "Tom Jones").

Eleanor Jones
Eleanor Jones (Oliver's mother) seems to harbor an obsession with Michael Jackson, as she repeatedly tries to get Oliver to emulate him. She is normally seen cooking or cleaning and is frequently freaked out by Oliver's experiments.

Judge Kirby

The local judge. Often locks horns with Steve Dallas.

Dr. Legrunt
Dr. Legrunt was the beer drinking, hardhat-wearing surgeon who treated Steve Dallas following an attack on Dallas by Sean Penn. Immediately after the operation, he "debrief[ed] the patient" by whispering repeatedly to the still-drugged Dallas, "You will not sue." In response to a query about what restrictions a person with a broken back was under, he told Steve that "Foolin' around is out." Berke Breathed has said that Dr. Legrunt was based on one of his own doctors named Dr. Legant.

Charles Limekiller
Charles Limekiller (or "Skip Limekiller", as on July 9, 1981) was a bum of apparent Australian origin who sought room and board at the Bloom Boarding House in March 1981. When he was first introduced, it was revealed that Limekiller had been estranged from his wife, Eleanor and their three children. Initially, Major Bloom disapproved of having him around, but Bess was so enchanted by Limekiller's usage of French that he had no choice but to let Limekiller stay (even though what he actually said was "Something like 'Your earlobes resemble fish heads'").  Eleanor, his ex, visited in March 1981.  While a prominent character during the summer of 1981 (to the extent of becoming the county television network's main reporter), Limekiller vanished following a storyline involving said network involuntarily shipping him to England to provide live coverage on Prince Charles and Diana Spencer's wedding in July 1981. Following a two-year absence, Limekiller reappeared, albeit with a modified character design, as the Meadow Party's first presidential nominee in 1983. However, his nomination was short-lived; after taking an impolitic jab at his campaign committee, "a black, a woman, two dips and a cripple" (a commentary on then-Secretary of the Interior James G. Watt), he was dropped from the Meadow ticket before the actual election year had even come. He disappeared shortly thereafter.

Originally, Limekiller was depicted as a somewhat nattily dressed bum, including a battered top hat, and wore a pair of sun glasses. Breathed later described him as "a sloppy retread of Doonesburys Duke. When he was reintroduced for the presidential race storyline, he was changed, presumably to better distinguish him from Steve Dallas. The sunglasses were abandoned, his clothes became the more standard attire of a homeless man, and he now had a jutting chin covered with stubble. It was at this time his Australian accent was introduced, whereas before he'd faked a learned manner of speech when he spoke.

Lola Limekiller
A very short time after Charles Limekiller's disappearance, a little old lady named Lola Limekiller appeared for a while in the strip. Her relation to the original Limekiller was never explained.

She is a radical environmental activist and good friends with the cockroaches in her kitchen. It is possible she was intended as a reworking of Milo's grandmother, Bess. She only appeared during the latter half of a story arc where Opus, thinking he'd booked passage on a pleasure cruise to Antarctica, instead wound up aboard the Rainbow Warrior on an anti-whaling mission.

In a later strip, a Mrs. Limekiller (as Milo refers to her) is shown to have watched too many violent killings on TV and "finally snapped", as she was trying to shoot daytime TV stars, including Vanna White. Whether or not this was Lola Limekiller is unknown.

Quiche LorraineQuiche Lorraine''' appeared from 1982 to 1983 as the cousin of Bobbi Harlow and was a shallow young woman who frequently dated Steve Dallas. She re-appeared in 1986 to reveal that she only liked Steve for his looks and was breaking up with him because he had been put in a partial head cast after an accident.

Milquetoast the Cockroach
Though Breathed had sporadically used cockroaches in Bloom County beforehand, Milquetoast was the first cockroach to become a significant player in the strip. First appearing in the strip's later years, he is a purple cockroach with a large nose, and is often depicted as disgusting and unsavory. He is Opus' recurring nemesis, and frequently bests him in battles of wit. Milquetoast has also done such things as squirt chemicals (like Liquid-Plumr, for instance) up Opus' nose and claim he has no control over his behavior. He also steals food and sends subliminal messages to the other members of the Bloom Boardinghouse while they sleep.

Milquetoast was also one of the original Bloom County characters to cross over into Outland, where he became a major player. During Outlands run, he is revealed to be an occasional cross-dresser. Also during Outland, Milquetoast is depicted as Opus' best friend, after Ronald-Ann Smith.

In the animated Outland Christmas special A Wish for Wings That Work, Milquetoast was voiced by Dustin Hoffman.

Alf MushpieAlf Mushpie first appeared as a blind date fluke with Opus. Unfortunately for Opus, Alf proved to be a virulent feminist, misandrist and presumed lesbian.

Alf and Opus had some disastrous dates before Opus and Cutter John disappeared over the ocean (and were subsequently presumed dead) in a flying wheelchair accident. Alf was left with the book Learn How to be a Model...or Just Look Like One!, as spelled out in Opus' will.

Later it was revealed that Alf had been seen in Tehran in 1985 lighting a pile of bras and veils, and was forcibly conscripted by the Iranians to be a "minesweeper" on the Iraqi front by 1988.

Ms. Mushpie was the first lesbian on the comics page. (Dykes To Watch Out For, by Alison Bechdel, which appeared first in 1983, did not appear in daily papers, as Bloom County did). Berke Breathed stated in a footnote of "The Complete Bloom County Collection" that he realized in retrospect how problematic it was to have her catchphrase be "I hate men," and that she was portrayed in what seemed like a positive light at the time.

Ms. OpusMs. Opus was Opus' mother. Opus spent most of his time in Bloom County searching for her, a recurring staple of the strip. While initially discovering (after many unsuccessful attempts) that she had been killed saving soldiers in the Falklands War, he later found her being used for cruel experiments by the Mary Kay Cosmetics company, physically resembling Opus, albeit with a pink petticoat and umbrella. Unfortunately, the two were soon separated in a battle between Mary Kay and the ALF. At the end of Bloom County, he declined Ronald-Ann's offer to enter Outland, and the last strip of the latter showed him finding her in Antarctica and warmly cuddling with her.

However, as shown in Opus, she did not turn out to be the mother figure he'd hoped for (for instance, she constantly doted on him and forced him to marry a gluttonous female penguin named Eunice), and he returned to Bloom County (where he tried to find a more likable mother-figure) on a crashed Mars rover. As with Breathed's artwork itself, Ms. Opus' appearance had changed: She physically resembled a real penguin compared to her son, she was much larger, uglier, and had a subtle potbelly, and her behavior was a cross of that of a real penguin and a stereotypical overbearing mother. Many years later Opus claimed that her mahjong club followed his career online.

Otis OracleOtis Oracle was the head of the Bloom County chapter of the Moral Majority. He was depicted as a short balding man with glasses who held a strong disdain for those who did not listen to him. Otis was also shown to be a right-wing extremist. He constantly decried the actions of the world as sinful, complained about the left-wing, and organized book-burning parties, with objections ranging from sensible, mainstream qualms over sex and violence to ridiculous objections, such as calling for the banning of The Roger Tory Peterson Guide to Penguins due to its portrayal of penguins in cohabitation. However, he proved to be at least a little hypocritical by touching ladies' knees, then blaming the ladies for tempting "the inner demons of sin in men." In addition, once after a New Year's party he woke up in the rafters, apparently drunk. When identified by Milo he quickly explained he had been assaulted, drugged and left for dead (albeit in the rafters, minus his clothes) but this was probably a cover story.

He frequently appeared in the early days of Bloom County, but faded away around 1982.

Editor OverbeekEditor Van Overbeek was the alcoholic editor of the Bloom Picayune, the newspaper that employed Milo. Overbeek constantly butted heads with the Federal Communications Commission and other federal agencies, as well as self-imposed media censors such as Otis Oracle. All of his editorials were based on his mantra "it's Reagan's fault." Editor Overbeek's most common response to one of Milo's requests to go to press with an outrageous story he had just written was "RUN THAT BABY!!"

Yaz PistachioYaz Pistachio was introduced in June 1983 as Bobbi Harlow's sixteen-year-old niece in need of a date for the junior prom. Bobbi's ex-boyfriend, Steve Dallas, was recruited to accompany Yaz. The prom was a horrible failure, as Steve got drunk early on, the school quarterback insulted Yaz, and Steve ended up puking during their spotlight dance, although she and Opus did enjoy a dance together (the latter being supported by Binkley and Milo so that he could reach her). After that, Yaz appeared most often in early Meadow Party storylines, as well as in Binkley's Return of the Jedi dream sequence.

When Yaz challenged Opus to think of a stupider name than Yaz Pistachio, he responded 'Berkeley Breathed.'

Although she had a few storylines of her own in the strip (many of which were left out of subsequent Bloom County collections), Yaz never really caught on as a popular character. After her last appearance in the strip in January 1984, she was promptly forgotten in the Bloom County universe.

Yaz was usually seen wearing a flat cap.

L.H. PuttgrassL.H. Puttgrass was a loud man who embraced his right to have his opinions heard, which included 'killing all the lawyers' and 'more skin on HBO'. His commentaries always ended with "This is L. H. Puttgrass signing off and heading for the tub!"

"Rockin' Charmin' Harmin""Rockin' Charmin' Harmin" was a popular disc jockey for Bloom County's classic rock radio station, KRNA. Twice he embarrassed Binkley over the air by exposing Binkley's need for bedwetting and nose-picking self-help literature. Though his voice was heard over the radio in the strip, he was never seen in person, and remained an unseen character. 
Opus' phone rang sometimes with calls for Harmon.
The character's name came from "Charmin'" Jeff Harmon, a popular afternoon DJ at KRNA-FM. KRNA was an actual rock station located in Iowa City, Iowa, where Berke Breathed lived while writing the strip. The station was later bought out by Cumulus Media and moved to Cedar Rapids in 1999.

RabiesRabies was Milo's (and, in a small number of strips from August 1981, Steve Dallas's) lapdog, who could talk. He only appeared during the first few months of the strip, later to disappear (beyond the Sunday strip logo box, in which he was depicted as leaning against the logo while smoking a cigar until January 1982) around August 1981.

Rabies was also a character in Breathed's previous comic strip, The Academia Waltz, where he was Steve Dallas's dog, a position he re-adopted in his final "Bloom County" appearances.

Rosebud the BasselopeRosebud the Basselope was the world's last basselope (a cross between a basset hound and an antelope). The rest of the basselopes died of clogged arteries, as they liked much butter on their Pop-Tarts. Rosebud made her first appearance while Milo and Opus were hunting for a beast that "easily devours fifty rhinos a day." Basselopes supposedly live extremely long lives due to "taking cold showers." Rosebud was part of three gag government weapon programs against the Soviet Union. One involved Rosebud launching a six megaton atomic bomb from between her antlers with a large rubber band. The second depicted Rosebud as the control system for a space weapon, described as "powered by twinkies, cheaper than a computer, somewhat slow reflexes but can hold [her] breath for six months or more." The third had Rosebud disguised as an old Russian woman and distributing American commercials, Dove Bars, Mickey Mouse clothing, and cheeseburgers.
Rosebud was eventually revealed to be female.  Rosebud tried out for Steve Dallas's heavy metal rock band but was unsuccessful and ended up becoming an equipment carrier. After it was revealed that Rosebud was a female, it was discovered that Rosebud had had an affair with Hodge-Podge the jackrabbit, and was pregnant. Rosebud gave birth to 64 jackabasselopes who matured and left after a week.
Rosebud the basselope reappeared in the 2015 reboot of the strip, and now could fly by inflating her antlers with helium or 'dandelion gas', as balloons  While Oliver Wendell Jones did not believe in her, Opus continued to believe that she was real.
In 2018, Donald Trump, Jr., who had killed the next-to-last basselope, tried to kill Rosebud with his gun, "Big Pappy", and Rosebud fought back, biting off his ear. This caused something of a stir.

Rosebud Enterprises is also the name of Breathed's personal business.

Sam the Lion
In the reboot of the strip, Steve Dallas meets Sue, a waitress and single mother whose son Sam has terminal cancer; Sam is introduced on Dec 6, 2015.  He's called Sam the Lion, a reference to The Last Picture Show.  Opus takes him on as a pro bono client in his "Emotional Support Penguin" business, and Steve masquerades as a Sith Lord in order to cheer the boy up, wearing a bedpan and a bathrobe to play the role. On Christmas Day 2015, Steve pulled an 'all-nighter' to move Sam's belongings to the hospital as a Christmas present.  He and Opus got Sam a dog, Zulu, and took him out of the hospital from time to time to join the pop-culture games which are a staple of the strip.

Bart SavagewoodBart Savagewood was Lola Granola's ex-boyfriend. He is a tall, ruggedly-handsome mustachioed test pilot for the U.S. Navy's F-20 Tigershark. His hobbies include catching sharks, and weight-lifting (it is mentioned that he bench presses 290 lbs.) He made Opus – who nicknamed him "The Human Chin" – feel inadequate.

Opus' televisionOpus' television usually appeared in segments used to satirize consumerism. It would often get on its (until then, unseen) hind legs during infomercials and either browbeat or hypnotize Opus into buying copious quantities of whatever product it was advertising (typically products sold by Ronco, and which always seemed to involve "turnip twaddling"). Earlier segments, which featured Opus being unable to talk, had Opus watching PBS, specifically Sesame Street, then making a poor attempt to repeat the word of the day. One time Opus did get a sentence correct was "Mr. Rogers should be paid more dough", only for the TV to remark, "Wait, will you write that down and send a letter?"

W. A. Thornhump IIIW. A. Thornhump III was introduced as the fictional CEO of Bloom County Industries in 1986. Thornhump was Breathed's attempt at satirizing the perceived hypocrisy of money-grubbing corporate America, as well as the unreasonable demands of the cartoon syndicate bosses. Typical examples of this hypocrisy were his replacing characters with scab workers when they decided to go on strike and a Sunday strip that showed the results of drug tests of employees of the cartoons and even Berke Breathed himself, who Thornhump thinks should be executed because the drug test revealed that he ate "one marijuana brownie six years ago." Thornhump's test, of course, reveals that he is a serious alcoholic. This point is driven home when Opus appears with his six-martini lunch. Nevertheless, the final verdict of his test declares him to be "drug-free."

Thornhump was always prepared to pander to whomever he felt the need to pander to. He also did whatever he could to make a quick buck or rating point, regardless of legal, moral, or ethical issues, even going so low as to schedule a field trip to the "Acme Stewardess Academy" during a "Nudeness Week" in the strip.

Thornhump was not present when Bloom County was "sold" to Donald Trump in Bill the Cat's body, although he was later parodied in an editorial cartoon by Calvin and Hobbes creator Bill Watterson that attacked Breathed's penchant for allowing merchandising rights for his creations.

Tess TurboTess Turbo was a rebellious rock star who first appeared at the Meadow Party's 1983 benefit concert, (a satirical take on Steve Wozniak's Us Festival) with Opus playing air guitar behind her. One of the comic strips from this time revealed her inner dialogue in which she characterized herself as a "shy, sensitive, withdrawn young woman who likes Smurf dolls, sad rainy days, and silly, romantic poetry", in contrast to her public image.

She appeared in an early strip, in which Steve Dallas won a role in her MTV music video after being unknowingly entered by Opus. Steve unsuccessfully sued her after all his chest hair was permanently burned off during the making of the video (referencing Michael Jackson's similar incident the previous year); during the trial, televised on The People's Court, she called Steve a "total jerkface" who deserved everything that he got. Her songs include "Scuzzbucket From Nantucket".

Tess, along with her band "The Blackheads", was a parody of Joan Jett and the Blackhearts.

"Weird" Harold"Weird" Harold' was a classmate of Yaz Pistachio's, presented as a socially awkward geek. He was the only boy who paid Yaz any attention, much to her horror and disgust. He was present at Yaz's prom, telling her his observation of a snake having marital relations with a garden hose and later became her accidental target in a game of spin the bottle. He only appeared in storylines pertaining to Yaz, meaning that he was not seen again after 1983.

Zulu
Zulu is Sam the Lion's dog, found by Opus in a strange vision quest recalling Dickens' A Christmas Carol''. Sam's mom had sent Steve Dallas to find the dog and Steve spent her money on dog food and so on, leaving Opus to bargain with thirty-nine cents.  The dog, a mutt with three legs, was in a shelter one day away from euthanasia.  He came to live with Sam and could talk as could other animals.

Citations

Bloom County characters